The 33rd edition of the annual Hypo-Meeting took place on 26 May and 27 May 2007 in Götzis, Austria. The track and field competition, featuring a decathlon (men) and a heptathlon (women) event, was part of the 2007 IAAF World Combined Events Challenge.

Men's decathlon

Schedule

26 May

27 May

Records

Results

Women's heptathlon

Schedule

26 May

27 May

Records

Results

See also
2007 World Championships in Athletics – Men's decathlon
Athletics at the 2007 Summer Universiade – Men's decathlon
2007 World Championships in Athletics – Women's heptathlon

References
 decathlon2000
 IAAF results

2007
Hypo-Meeting
Hypo-Meeting